Camilo Ernesto Mejía (born August 28, 1975) is a Nicaraguan who left the United States Army during the Iraq War on conscientious objector grounds, was convicted of desertion and went on to become an anti-war activist. He is also the son of Carlos Mejia Godoy, Nicaragua songwriter.

Service and court-martial
Mejía is a graduate of the University of Miami in Coral Gables, Florida, where he majored in psychology and Spanish. Mejía spent six months in  Iraq (his first and only combat tour).  Mejia returned to the United States on a 2-week furlough in order to address an issue with his Lawful Permanent Resident (LPR) status; after which he did not return for duty. He was charged with desertion and sentenced to one year in prison for refusing to return to fight in Iraq. In March 2004, he turned himself in to the US military and filed an application for conscientious objector status.

On May 21, 2004, Mejía was convicted of desertion by a military jury and sentenced to one year confinement, reduction to the rank of Private E-1, and a Bad Conduct Discharge.

Mejía served his sentence at the Fort Sill military prison in Lawton, Oklahoma. During his time in custody, he was recognized by Amnesty International as a prisoner of conscience and was awarded by Refuse and Resist with its Courageous Resister Award. He was also the recipient of the Peace Abbey Courage of Conscience Award which was presented by his attorney Louis Font. Camilo was recognized by the Detroit, Michigan, City Council with a commendation for his stand.

After prison
Camilo Mejía was released from prison on February 15, 2005. Since his release, he has spoken at many peace protests and to the press about his experiences and his opposition to the war in Iraq. In 2005, he was recognized with the 'Young Leader Award' by Global Exchange, in San Francisco.

In August 2005, Camilo along with Desert Storm Veteran Dennis Kyne, stormed President Bush's vacation ranch house with Cindy Sheehan And future members of Camp Casey  

Mejía has recently written a book entitled Road from Ar Ramadi: The Private Rebellion of Staff Sergeant Mejía which recounts his journey of conscience in Iraq.

Mejía is interviewed in "The Ground Truth: After the Killing Ends (2006)", a documentary about the training and alleged dehumanization of U.S. soldiers, and how they struggle to come to terms with it when they come back home. In August 2007, Mejía was named the chair of the board of directors of Iraq Veterans Against the War.

Song about Mejía
In early 2006, alternative reggae/rock band State Radio released the album Us Against the Crown, which features the song "Camilo". When they heard of his story, State Radio wanted to bring conscientious objection to light. Lyrics in the song reflect on Camilo Mejía's situation:

Twenty days in a concrete fallout/ What life have I to take your own/ Oh my country, won't you call out/ Doorbells are ringing with boxes of bones/ And from another land's war torn corners/ To a prison cell in my own/ Punish me for not taking your orders/ But don't lock me up for not leavin' my home Camilo/ Camilo/ Leaving my home/ Camilo/ Camilo

See also

List of Iraq War resisters
Peter Lilienthal
Nuremberg Principles#Principle IV

References

Further Information
Zeiger, David, Evangeline Griego, Aaron Zarrow, Troy Garity, and Edward Asner. Sir! No sir! a David Zeiger film. New York, NY: Docurama Films, 2006.

External links
FreeCamilo.com

1975 births
American conscientious objectors
Amnesty International prisoners of conscience held by the United States
Iraq War resisters
Living people
Nicaraguan emigrants to the United States
Nicaraguan male writers
People from Managua
Political prisoners
Political prisoners in the United States
Prisoners and detainees of the United States military
United States Army personnel of the Iraq War
United States Army soldiers